David Earl Nething (born June 29, 1933) is a retired politician in the American state of North Dakota.

Nething was born in Valley City, North Dakota. He attended Jamestown College, where he received his A.B. and the University of North Dakota School of Law, receiving his Juris Doctor. After university, he served in the United States Army from 1951 to 1952.

Nething was elected to the North Dakota State Senate for District 29 as a Republican and served until 2012. He served stints as majority leader (1975–1985) president pro tempore (1997–98). Towards the end of his Senate career, he served as chairman of the Senate's Judiciary Committee. He did not run for re-election in 2012, opting to retire.

Nething is married to Marjorie and has three children. They reside in Jamestown, North Dakota. He is an elder in the Presbyterian church.

References

External links
 

People from Barnes County, North Dakota
2012 United States presidential electors
University of Jamestown alumni
University of North Dakota alumni
North Dakota lawyers
Republican Party North Dakota state senators
American Presbyterians
Living people
1933 births